Martha Collins may refer to:
Martha Layne Collins (born 1936), American politician
Martha Collins (poet) (born 1940)